Wuxi Xinqu railway station is a railway station of Shanghai–Nanjing Intercity Railway located in Xinwu District (formerly Wuxi New District), Wuxi, Jiangsu, People's Republic of China. 

It is one of three railway stations serving Wuxi. Wuxi railway station is the most central and is on the Beijing–Shanghai railway and the Shanghai–Nanjing intercity railway. Wuxi East railway station is more remote and is on the Beijing–Shanghai high-speed railway.

Metro station
A station on the Line 3 of the Wuxi Metro opened in 2020.

Railway stations in Jiangsu
Stations on the Shanghai–Nanjing Intercity Railway